Holacanthus africanus, the Guinean angelfish or West African angelfish, is species of marine ray-finned fish, a marine angelfish belonging to the family Pomacanthidae. It is found in the warmer sections of the eastern Atlantic Ocean off the coast of West Africa.

Description 
Holocanthus africanus is differently coloured in juveniles and adults. The juvenile Guinean angelfish has a dark blue body with thin light blue vertical bars on either side of the eye. They also have a yellow caudal fin and yellow lips with a broad vertical white band in the middle of their flanks. As is they mature, the blue changes to olive green, with the white vertical bar on the flanks widening and becoming more yellowish. They also gain an almost black colour on the caudal peduncle. They may retain yellow areas along the margins of the dorsal and anal fins, and there is a dark ocellus visible behind the operculum.

Distribution
Holacanthus africanus is found from Senegal to the Congo estuary, including the Cape Verde and São Tomé islands. It has been reported for the first time in the Mediterranean Sea in Valletta harbour, Malta in 2017.

Habitat and biology
The Guinean angelfish has a non-specialized diet. It feeds primarily on sponges, but also on tunicates, jellyfish, and soft corals as well as algae and plankton. Around the Cape Verde islands, this species is often found in quite dense mixed species shoals, the Guinean angelfish being dominant.

Systematics
Holacanthus africanus was first formally described in 1951 by the French ichthyologist Jean Cadenat (1908–1992) with the type locality given as Gorée in Senegal.

Utilisation
Holacanthus africanus does appear in the aquarium trade, albeit only a few times annually and it commands high prices. Availability increased in the late 2010s.

References 
 
 
 

africanus
Fish of the Atlantic Ocean
Fish of the Mediterranean Sea
Marine fish of Africa
Marine fauna of Central Africa
Marine fauna of West Africa
Fish described in 1951
Taxa named by Jean Cadenat